The 2009 FIA WTCC Race of Brazil (formally the 2009 FIA WTCC HSBC Race of Brazil) was the first round of the 2009 World Touring Car Championship season. It was held on March 8, 2009 at the Autódromo Internacional de Curitiba near Curitiba, Brazil. It was the fourth running of the FIA WTCC Race of Brazil.

The two races were won by SEAT's Yvan Muller and Gabriele Tarquini, with SEAT filling both podiums.

Background
The race marked the arrival of a fourth manufacturer, with Lada giving full backing to the Russian Bears Motorsport team, forming the Lada Sport team. SEAT, BMW and Chevrolet returned for their fifth seasons in the series, with Chevrolet introducing the new Cruze model.

Reigning Independents Trophy champion Sergio Hernández had joined BMW Team Italy-Spain from Scuderia Proteam Motorsport, swapping seats with fellow Spaniard Félix Porteiro. After a one-off appearance for the team in 2008, Tom Boardman joined SUNRED Engineering full-time, while Marin Čolak joined the series, forming his own team. Stefano D'Aste had returned to Wiechers-Sport, while Kristian Poulsen had joined Liqui Moly Team Engstler.

Report

Testing and free practice
SEAT Sport driver Tarquini was fastest in the Friday test session. His fastest time was less than a tenth of a second faster than the BMW pair of Augusto Farfus and Jörg Müller. Behind them were five SEATs led by Yvan Muller, while the new Chevrolet Cruze was ninth in the hands of Nicola Larini. Scuderia Proteam Motorsport driver Porteiro was the fastest driver in the Yokohama Independents' Trophy. Jaap van Lagen was the fastest Lada driver. SUNRED driver Tom Coronel stopped early on in the session when his engine failed while Engstler Motorsport driver Poulsen didn't get any running due to a fuel pump failure.

Defending champion Yvan Muller led a SEAT 1–2–3–4–5 in the Saturday morning practice session with Farfus sixth as the best BMW runner. Porteiro was once again the fastest independent driver while Larini was the fastest Chevrolet. BMW Team UK driver Andy Priaulx finished 17th having suffered from brake problems.

Jörg Müller was fastest in the second free practice session ahead of earlier pace setter Yvan Muller. Priaulx was third after his brake problems in the morning session, while Alain Menu put his Chevrolet in seventh. Coronel missed more practice time due to a clutch problem on his Sunred SEAT.

Qualifying
For the first time qualifying was split into two sessions. The first determined the top ten, who would go through to the second session. The first session was red-flagged after five minutes when Kristian Poulsen crashed heavily into the wall at the final turn. Yvan Muller was fastest in the session, ahead of Gabriele Tarquini. Amongst those that went out in Q1 were Sergio Hernández, Rob Huff and Alex Zanardi.

Muller also set the fastest time in Q2, winning pole position ahead of his teammates, Jordi Gené, Tarquini, Tiago Monteiro and Rickard Rydell.

Warm-Up
Jörg Müller was the fastest driver in Sunday mornings warm up session, leading a BMW 1–2–3 ahead of Farfus and Priaulx. Pole sitter Yvan Muller was fourth.

Race One
The first race was dominated by Muller, as he led from the beginning until the end. SEAT teammates Gené, Rydell and Tarquini finished in second, third and fourth respectively. Alain Menu retired following a collision on the opening lap, involving him and the BMWs of Jörg Müller and Andy Priaulx. Müller spent five laps in the pits before rejoining the race, while Priaulx went on to climb from 21st to ninth. The safety car was introduced on lap six, following a crash for Stefano D'Aste. Nicola Larini finished the race in fifth, scoring the first points for the new Chevrolet Cruze. Augusto Farfus finished sixth ahead of Hernández and Monteiro. Félix Porteiro won the Independents’ class, finishing tenth overall.

After the race, Larini and Monteiro were given 30-second penalties after overtaking during the safety car period, dropping them to 15th and 16th respectively. Jaap van Lagen and George Tanev were also given the same penalties. Andy Priaulx and Porteiro inherited seventh and eighth places respectively.

Race Two
SEAT encored in race two, once again placing four drivers in the top four positions. The race started behind the safety car on a track flooded by a violent thunderstorm, with
Félix Porteiro who had inherited pole position after Tiago Monteiro’s penalty. In the early stages the BMW drivers - Félix Porteiro, Andy Priaulx, Sergio Hernández and Augusto
Farfus – set the pace, but soon the SEAT tide became unstoppable. Gabriele Tarquini, Rickard Rydell, Jordi Gené and Yvan Muller jumped on top to stay, while Porteiro repeated his success in the Independents’ class.

Results

Qualifying

Race 1

Bold denotes Fastest lap.

Race 2

Bold denotes Fastest lap.

Standings after the event

Drivers' Championship standings

Yokohama Independents' Trophy standings

Manufacturers' Championship standings

 Note: Only the top five positions are included for both sets of drivers' standings.

References

External links
Results Booklet PDF at MST Systems

Brazil
Race of Brazil